Route 30 is a highway in eastern Missouri, United States. Its eastern terminus is at the Interstate 55/Interstate 44 junction in St. Louis. Its western terminus is at Interstate 44 in St. Clair. In St. Louis, the section between Interstate 44 and Route 366 is part of historic U.S. Route 66 and is marked as such. In the St. Louis area, it is known as Gravois Avenue or Gravois Road. Further south, Gravois Rd is used to mark the old section of the highway where the newer, divided highway rerouted Highway 30.

Route description
Route 30 begins as it crosses over Interstate 55 at I-55's interchange with I-44. Shortly after the intersection with Route 366, the road becomes a narrow street passing through some older parts of St. Louis. At the city limits of St. Louis, it continues into the suburban area (unincorporated). Shortly before reaching Grantwood Village is the northern terminus with Route 21. About  further west is the intersection with Lindbergh Boulevard (U.S. 50 / U.S. 61 / U.S. 67) and the road becomes a four-lane divided highway.

As the highway continues southwest in the suburban St. Louis area, the road has several traffic lights which gradually diminish as the road approaches Cedar Hill. West of Cedar Hill, the divided highway ends and the road becomes a winding road all the way to its end. A portion of the highway over the Meramec River was re-routed in the early 2000s when a new, wider bridge was built.

West of Lonedell is the beginning of a concurrency with Route 47. The concurrency ends  later inside the city limits of St. Clair. The road briefly joins former U.S. Route 66, turns a corner, and ends at Interstate 44.

Mass transit
The southern half of MetroBus Route #10 (Lindell-Gravois) follows Gravois Ave from the Civic Center Station at 14th and Spruce, then onto Tucker and Chouteau. From Tucker, the route follows nearly the entirety of Gravois Ave until it reaches the Hampton Loop at Hampton and Gravois.

Major intersections

See also

References

External links

030
030
Streets in St. Louis
Transportation in Franklin County, Missouri
Transportation in Jefferson County, Missouri
Transportation in St. Louis County, Missouri